The Shire of Toodyay is a local government area in the Wheatbelt region of Western Australia, beyond the north-eastern limits of the Perth metropolitan area.

History

The Toodyay Road District was established on 24 January 1871. The Newcastle (later Toodyay) townsite separated as the Municipality of Newcastle on 2 October 1877. The municipality merged back into the road district on 8 March 1912. On 1 July 1961, Toodyay became a shire under the Local Government Act 1960, which reformed all remaining road districts into shires.

Wards
The Shire has been divided into 4 wards, since the Toodyay Road board meeting in June 1904.

 North Ward (2 councillors)
 Central Ward (2 councillors)
 West Ward (3 councillors)
 East Ward (2 councillors)

Towns and localities
The towns and localities of the Shire of Toodyay with population and size figures based on the most recent Australian census:

Presidents

Population

Heritage-listed places

As of 2023, 173 places are heritage-listed in the Shire of Toodyay, of which 16 are on the State Register of Heritage Places.

See also

 Wikipedia:WikiTown/Toodyaypedia

References

External links
 

 
Toodyay